Mura is a language of Amazonas, Brazil. It is most famous for Pirahã, its sole surviving dialect. Linguistically, it is typified by agglutinativity, a very small phoneme inventory (around 11 compared to  around 44 in English), whistled speech, and the use of tone.

In the 19th century, there were an estimated 30,000–60,000 Mura. It is now spoken by only 300 Pirahã people in eight villages.

Dialects
Since at least Barboza Rodrigues (1892) [reference?], there have been three ethnic names commonly listed as dialects of Mura, or even as Muran languages. The names are:
 Bohurá, or Buxwaray, the original form of the name 'Mura'; spoken on the Autaz River
 Pirahã, or Pirahá, Pirahán, the name the remaining dialect goes by
 Yahahí, also spelled Jahahi; spoken on the Branco River
On the basis of a minuscule amount of data, it would appear that Bohurá (Mura proper) was mutually intelligible with Pirahã; however, for Yahahí there exists only ethnographic information, and it can be assumed they spoke the same language as other Mura. Rodrigues describes the Yahahí as having come from the Branco river, a tributary of the right bank of the upper Marmelos river. The last Yahahí are said to have joined the Pirahã.

This was pronounced Murá by their neighbors, the Torá and Matanawi. In his vocabulary, Rodrigues lists Bohura for the people and bhurai-ada "Mura language" for the language, from the Mura of the Manicoré River; Tastevin has Bohurai and bohuarai-arase for the same. They also record,

  "That one is Mura"
  "We are all Mura"
(Caution: these words need to be confirmed.

Genealogical relations
Mura is often proposed to be related to Matanawí. Kaufman (1994) also suggests a connection with Huarpe in his Macro-Warpean proposal.

Vocabulary
Loukotka (1968) lists the following basic vocabulary items for Mura language varieties.

{| class="wikitable sortable"
! gloss !! Múra !! Bohurá !! Pirahá
|-
! one
|  || huyiː || 
|-
! two
|  || mukui || 
|-
! head
| a-pái || hana-pai || a-paixi
|-
! ear
| ku-pái || hane-apue || apu-pay
|-
! tooth
| aro-pái || haine-tué || atu-pay
|-
! hand
| upa || hane-uí || upai
|-
! woman
| yúehẽ || kairi || yuéhe
|-
! water
| pé || ipé || pé
|-
! fire
| foai || huai || wái
|-
! stone
| atí || atí || begé
|-
! maize
| chihuha || tihoʔahai || chifuä
|-
! tapir
| kabachí || kabatí || kauátei
|}

Notes

Bibliography

 Campbell, Lyle. (1997). American Indian languages: The historical linguistics of Native America. New York: Oxford University Press. .
Everett, D. L. (1992). A língua Pirahã e a teoria da sintaxe: descrição, perspectivas e teoria. Campinas: Editora da Unicamp.
Hanke, W. (1950a). O idioma Mura. Arquivos: Coletânea de documentor para a História da Amazônia, 12:3-8.
Hanke, W. (1950b). Vocabulário e idioma mura dos índios mura do rio Manicoré. Arquivos, 12:3-8.
Heinrichs, A. (1961). Questionário: Mura-Pirahã Rio Marmelos. (Questionário dos Vocabulários Padrões para estudos comparativos preliminares de línguas indígenas brasileiras.) Rio de Janeiro: Museu Nacional.
Heinrichs, A. (1963). Questionário: Mura-Pirahã Rios Marmelos e Maici. (Questionário dos Vocabulários Padrões para estudos comparativos preliminares de línguas indígenas brasileiras.) Rio de Janeiro: Museu Nacional.
 Kaufman, Terrence. (1994). The native languages of South America. In C. Mosley & R. E. Asher (Eds.), Atlas of the world's languages (pp. 46–76). London: Routledge.
 Curt Nimuendajú (1948): "The Mura" and "The Yahahi", in Handbook of South American Indians, Volume 3: The Tropical Forest Tribes, ed. Julian H. Steward, pp. 255–269.

External links

 PROEL: Grupo Muran

 
Endangered indigenous languages of the Americas